Alev Alev is a 1984 Turkish action film, directed by Halit Refiğ and starring Tarık Akan, Gülşen Bubikoğlu, and Cüneyt Arkın.

Plot

Cast 
 Cüneyt Arkın
 Gülşen Bubikoğlu
 Tarık Akan
 Çiğdem Tunç
 Hulusi Kentmen
 Sevda Aktolga
 Şemsi İnkaya
 Turgut Boralı
 Tevhit Bilge
 Nevzat Okçugil

References

External links

1984 films
Turkish action films
1984 action films
Films directed by Halit Refiğ